Sir Alimuddin Zumla, FRCP, FRCPath, FRSB (born 15 May 1955) is a British-Zambian professor of infectious diseases and international health at University College London Medical School. He specialises in infectious and tropical diseases, clinical immunology, and internal medicine, with a special interest in HIV/AIDS, respiratory infections (including COVID-19 and Tuberculosis), and diseases of poverty. He is known for his leadership of infectious/tropical diseases research and capacity development activities. He was awarded a Knighthood in the 2017 Queens Birthday Honours list for services to public health and protection from infectious disease. In 2012, he was awarded Zambia's highest civilian honour, the Order of the Grand Commander of Distinguished services - First Division. In 2022, for the fifth consecutive year, Zumla was recognised by Clarivate Analytics, Web of Science as one of the world's top 1% most cited researchers. In 2021 Sir Zumla was elected as Fellow of The World Academy of Sciences.

Early life
Alimuddin "Ali" Zumla was born in Northern Rhodesia (now Chipata, Eastern Province, Zambia). His parents Ismail and Aman Zumla were of Gujarati Indian origin. He resided in the Kamwala district of Lusaka. He did his early education at the Lotus Primary School and Prince Philip Secondary School (now Kamwala Secondary School) in Lusaka, and his medical training at the University of Zambia's School of Medicine. As a teenager, he declined a Rhodes Scholarship in order to pursue medical training in Zambia.

In 1980, Zumla moved to London to pursue an MSc in tropical medicine at the University of London. In 1982, he contracted life-threatening tuberculous meningitis, and was told that he would never walk again, but went on to recover and return to work a year and a half later despite disabling and painful neurological sequelae resulting from his meningitis. He went on to pursue doctoral studies on leprosy human monoclonal antibodies at the London School of Hygiene & Tropical Medicine, where his 1987 dissertation (advised by Keith McAdam) merited him the Alan Woodruff Medal.

Career
Zumla spent a year at the London School of Hygiene and Tropical Medicine gaining the MSc degree in Clinical Tropical Diseases with a distinction and the Murgratroyd Prize. He subsequently worked at The Royal Northern and Royal Free Hospitals under the mentorship of David Geraint James obtaining his Membership of The Royal College of Physicians of London.

After doing a PhD between 1985 and 1987, Zumla worked as infectious diseases registrar and at the Rush Green Regional Hospital for Infectious Diseases in Romford under Ming Yong and Mervyn Medlock. Whilst working at Rush Green Hospital, he identified and notified the first cases of the 1988 Legionnaires' Diseases outbreak which he traced back to Broadcasting House, BBC, central London.

Zumla subsequently spent four years in a senior registrar/honorary lecturer position at the Hammersmith Hospital, Royal Postgraduate Medical School in London under Sir Robert Lechler, and then two years at the University of Texas Center for Infectious Diseases working with Herbert DuPont. He then returned to his native Zambia to work on AIDS-related opportunistic infections at the University Teaching Hospital in Lusaka before moving to University College London in 1994.

In 2003, there were media reports about a paper of Zumla's in The Lancet discussing a new test developed by a team he led for monitoring CD4 immune cell counts based on dried blood samples. Such counts are used in monitoring AIDS patients taking antiretroviral drug treatments; Zumla's subsequent work has led to development and evaluation of a range of rapid, cheap and more accessible diagnostic tests for TB and respiratory infections for use on patients in developing countries.

Zumla was the guest editor of the Lancet TB Series which addressed key issues around TB treatment and diagnosis. The launch was held at the World Health Organisation (WHO) in Geneva on 18 May 2010. 
, Zumla is the director of the Centre for Infectious Diseases and International Health at University College London Medical School, as well as a consultant in infectious diseases at University College Hospital. His research interests include tuberculosis (particularly drug clinical trials, biomarkers, MDR-TB and TB in London), HIV/AIDS, tropical diseases, respiratory infections (and rapid diagnostics thereof), endocarditis, biomarkers, and transrenal DNA.

Zumla's work focuses on improving global health, especially for disadvantaged populations, with an emphasis on assisting poorer and disadvantaged peoples of the world. He established and directs a multi-country collaboration with several African, Middle Eastern, European and United States institutions on collaborative research and training program on TB and HIV/AIDS. Zumla and his collaborators have set up research and training programs in Africa, focusing attention on development of local infrastructure and capacity development. Several of his doctoral students now occupy academic positions in institutions in Africa.

Zumla has established north–south partnerships for TB research. His collaborations span five countries in Europe and 10 in sub-Saharan Africa, where he leads several multi-country research projects. His team's research findings have contributed to the development of WHO's management guidelines on treatment and prevention of TB and TB/HIV, and to improvements in the care of patients worldwide.

In 2014, together with colleagues from Public Health England, World Health Organization, London School of Hygiene and Tropical Medicine, and the Middle East, Zumla co-led The Lancet series on Mass Gatherings Medicine which was launched at the World Health Assembly of Ministers of Health in Geneva. This was a Series of reports about different mass gatherings: the London 2012 Olympic and Paralympic Games; the 2012 European Football Championship finals, hosted jointly by Poland and Ukraine; and the 2012 and 2013 Hajj. These reports set out the planning and surveillance systems used to monitor public health risks, and describe the public health experiences and lessons learnt for the planning of future events.

Zumla played a lead role in defining the etiology, epidemiology, mode of transmission of Middle East respiratory syndrome coronavirus.

Zumla is Vice Chair of the Strategic Advisory Group to the European and Developing Countries Clinical Trials Partnership

On 7 April 2015 at an inaugural meeting in Cape Town, South Africa, Zumla and Markus Maeurer from Karolinska Institutet Sweden led and established a new initiative, the Host-Directed Therapies Network (HDT-NET) consortium of 64 global partners to tackle global infectious diseases threats of multi-drug resistant TB and antimicrobial resistance.

In 2020, Zumla was cited as a leading expert on the COVID-19 pandemic.

In 2021 Zumla was elected as Fellow of The World Academy of Sciences whose principal aim is to promote scientific capacity and excellence for sustainable development in developing countries.

In 2022 Zumla was profiled in the Lancet. On the 12th October 2022, the Royal Society of Tropical Medicine and Hygiene awarded Zumla the Sir Patrick Manson Medal, their highest mark of distinction. Zumla is the first ethnic minority recipient of this award since its conception in 1923.

Awards

|-
! scope="row" | 1999
| Weber Parkes Trust Medal and Prize
| Royal College of Physicians of London
| 
| Awarded triennially from 1897 for work in the prevention and cure of tuberculosis.
| 
|-
! scope="row" | 2000
| Albert Chalmers Medal
| Royal Society of Tropical Medicine and Hygiene
| 
| Recognises researchers in tropical medicine or global health who demonstrate evidence of mentoring and professional development of junior investigators, and other forms of capacity building.
| 
|-
! scope="row" | 2003
| Windrush Award for Academic Achievement
| African Caribbean Achievement Project
| 
| The awards recognise talent and achievement in the African Caribbean, Asian and Oriental communities.
| 
|-
! scope="row" | 2005
| Ibn Sina Award for Medicine
| The Muslim News Awards for Excellence
| 
| Professional of the year for medicine.
| 
|-
! scope="row" | 2011
| Science Award
| UK India International Foundation
| 
| for outstanding achievements in science by  a professional with origins in India. 
| 
|-
! scope="row" | 2011
| Spinoza Leerstoel award
| University of Amsterdam
| 
| for “Outstanding research & capacity development achievements in the global fight against TB and TB/HIV/AIDS”
| 
|-
! scope="row" | 2011
| Kochon Prize and Medal
| World Health Organisation (WHO) Stop TB Partnership
| 
| Announced at the opening ceremony of the World Conference of the International Union Against Tuberculosis and Lung Disease (the Union) in Lille 
| 
|-
! scope="row" | 2012
| Annual Science Prize
| Karolinska Institutet
| 
| For outstanding outputs in global health and infectious diseases
| 
|- 
! scope="row" | 2012
| Grand Commander of the Order of Distinguished Services First Division
| Republic of Zambia
| 
| The highest Zambian civilian award. Bestowed on Zumla on the 48th anniversary of Zambia's Independence (October 2012) by then Zambian president Michael Sata for his outstanding contributions to infectious diseases research in sub-Saharan Africa, development of Zambia's health sector, and training of numerous health personnel. 
| 
|-
! scope="row" | 2016
| Honorary doctorate
| Karolinska Institutet
| 
| To individuals for their important scientific achievements or significant contributions to the university or humanity at large.
| 
|- 
! scope="row" | 2016
| European and Developing Countries Clinical Trials Partnership prize
| European and Developing Countries Clinical Trials Partnership
| 
| Won by a research consortium led by Zumla. Presented by Zambian President Edgar Lungu.
| 
|-
! scope="row" | 2017
| Senior investigator award
| National Institute for Health and Care Research
| 
| NIHR Senior Investigators are 'among the most prominent and prestigious researchers' and the most outstanding leaders within the NIHR Faculty. Senior Investigators are appointed from NIHR Investigators through annual competitions informed by the advice of an international panel of experts.
| 
|-
! scope="row" | 2018
| Annual global list of influential researchers
| Clarivate Analytics, Web of Science
| 
| World's top 1% most cited researchers.
| 
|-
! scope="row" | 2019
| Annual global list of influential researchers
| Clarivate Analytics, Web of Science
| 
| World's top 1% most cited researchers.
| 
|-
! scope="row" | 2020
| Annual global list of influential researchers
| Clarivate Analytics, Web of Science
| 
| World's top 1% most cited researchers.
| 
|-
! scope="row" | 2020
| Mahathir Science Award in Tropical Medicine
| Mahathir Science Award Foundation, Academy of Sciences Malaysia
| 
| A Malaysian science prize awarded to those who have made outstanding contributions to tropical sciences.
| 
|-
! scope="row" | 2020
| Dr Pascoal Mocumbi prize
| EU-EDCTP
| 
| Awarded to senior scientists, policy-makers or advocates for health and research
| 
|-
! scope="row" | 2021
| Annual global list of influential researchers
| Clarivate Analytics, Web of Science
| 
| World's top 1% most cited researchers.
| 
|-
! scope="row" | 2022
| Senior investigator award (Renewal)
| National Institute for Health and Care Research
| 
| NIHR Senior Investigators are 'among the most prominent and prestigious researchers' and the most outstanding leaders within the NIHR Faculty. Senior Investigators are appointed from NIHR Investigators through annual competitions informed by the advice of an international panel of experts.
| 
|-
! scope="row" | 2022
| Annual global list of influential researchers
| Clarivate Analytics, Web of Science
| 
| World's top 1% most cited researchers.
| 
|-
! scope="row" | 2022
| Sir Patrick Manson Medal
| Royal Society of Tropical Medicine and Hygiene
| 
| The Sir Patrick Manson Medal is the Royal Society of Tropical Medicine and Hygiene's highest mark of distinction. It is awarded once every three years to senior experts whose contribution to tropical medicine or hygiene is considered to merit the honour most.
|

Quotes

Selected works
Zumla has authored more than 700 publications and edited/published 21 medical textbooks, three of which are globally acknowledged classics: Manson's Tropical Diseases 21st and 22nd editions, Tuberculosis: A Comprehensive Clinical Reference which involves 156 global TB experts writing 104 chapters on all aspects of paediatric and adult TB, and Granulomatous Disorders co-edited with D. G. James.

Books

 
 H. Simon Schaaf and Alimuddin Zumla, Tuberculosis: A Comprehensive Clinical Reference

Edited works

Journal papers

Bibliographic databases
 
 
 
 Search Results for author Zumla on PubMed.

References

British pathologists
Zambian Muslims
Zambian infectious disease physicians
Zambian people of Gujarati descent
Zambian emigrants to the United Kingdom
Living people
Gujarati people
1955 births
Fellows of the Royal Society of Biology
Knights Bachelor
British people of Gujarati descent
Naturalised citizens of the United Kingdom
British Muslims
20th-century British medical doctors
21st-century British medical doctors
NIHR Senior Investigators
Fellows of the African Academy of Sciences